Västerås IK was a Swedish sports club located in Västerås, and founded on 6 January 1913.  From the start, the club was primarily associated with its participation in association football, but it would also participate in other sports, including athletics, bandy, handball, and ice hockey.

In 1980, the club was split up, with each section becoming a fully independent club, including:
 VIK Västerås HK (VIK Västerås Hockey Klubb) – ice hockey, also known as Västerås IK.
 Västerås IK Fotboll – association football.
 Västerås IK Handboll – handball

References

Sports clubs in Sweden
Sports clubs established in 1913
Sports clubs disestablished in 1980
1913 establishments in Sweden
Sport in Västerås

sv:Västerås IK